Bestie may refer to:

 Best friend
 Bestie (group), a South Korean band
 "Bestie" (DaBaby and YoungBoy Never Broke Again song), 2022
 "Bestie" (Yungen song), 2017
 "Bestie", a 2019 song by Bhad Bhabie
 "Bestie", a song by Jay Park from his 2011 album Take a Deeper Look
 Bestie (film), a 2022 Indian film
 George Best, Irish football player